Tavaresia is a genus of plants in the family Apocynaceae, first described as a genus in 1902. It is native to southern Africa.

Species
 Tavaresia angolensis Welw. - Angola 
 Tavaresia barklyi (Dyer) N.E.Br. - South Africa 
 Tavaresia grandiflora Berger - South Africa 
 Tavaresia meintjesii R.A. Dyer - Limpopo

formerly included
Tavaresia thompsoniorum van Jaarsv. & R.Nagel, syn of × Staparesia thompsoniorum (van Jaarsv. & R.Nagel) G.D.Rowley 

Taxonomy
Phylogenetic studies have shown the genus to be most closely related to the genus Huernia, and to a widespread branch of stapeliads comprising the genera Orbea, Piaranthus and Stapelia.

References

Asclepiadoideae
Apocynaceae genera